Succinea antiqua is an extinct species of small, air-breathing land snail, a terrestrial pulmonate gastropod mollusc in the family Succineidae, the amber snails.

References

Further reading
 Vincent G. (1886). "Note sur un gite fossilifère quaternaire observé a Veeweyde, près de Duysbourg". Annales Société Malacologie Belgique 21: 419–421.

Succineidae
Prehistoric gastropods